The French Protestant Church of London (Église protestante française de Londres) is a Reformed / Presbyterian church that has catered to the French-speaking community of London since 1550. It is the last remaining Huguenot church of London. Its current temple in Soho Square is a Grade II* listed building designed by Aston Webb and erected in 1891–93.

History
The Church was founded by a Royal Charter of King Edward VI on 24 July 1550.

At the request of the Huguenots of London, in 1560 John Calvin sent a trusted emissary from Geneva, pastor Nicolas des Gallars, to help provide the young congregation its Reformed theology and Presbyterian organisation.

In 1700, at the height of the French refugee population following the Revocation of the Edict of Nantes in 1685, 23 Huguenot places of worship existed in London. The Church's temple is the only one that is active today: the French Protestant Church in Brighton (opened in 1887) closed in 2008.

Organisation
The Church is a registered charity under English law. A related charity, The French Huguenot Church of London Charitable Trust, provides funds for the Church and other charitable objects.

Stéphane Desmarais has been the pastor of the Church since 1 September 2013. He is the 72nd French-speaking pastor of the Church since 1550, and the 70th pastor appointed to this office since Nicolas des Gallars in 1560.

The governing body of the Church is the Consistory. Its members are co-opted and tacitly approved by the congregation. The pastor is a member of the Consistory ex officio.

Notes and references

Sources
Yves Jaulmes, The French Protestant Church of London and the Huguenots: from the Church's foundation to the present day, published by the French Protestant Church of London, 1993, p. 59 .
Manifesto, (or Declaration of Principles), of the French Protestant Church of London, Founded by Charter of Edward VI. 24th July, A.D. 1550. By Order of the Consistory. London: Messrs. Seeleys, 1850.
The Economist, Changing Shadows: The many mansions in one east London house of God, 18 December 2003, https://www.economist.com/node/2281603
Listing Entry by Historic England
The French Protestant Church, British History Online

Gallery

See also

John Houblon
Courtauld family
French Protestant Church, Brighton

External links
French Protestant Church of London
The Huguenot Society of Great Britain and Ireland

1550 establishments in England
Christian charities based in the United Kingdom
Huguenot history in the United Kingdom
Grade II* listed churches in the City of Westminster
Soho Square
Presbyterian churches in England
Huguenots
Liberal Christianity denominations
19th-century Presbyterian churches
Calvinist organizations established in the 16th century
16th-century churches in the United Kingdom